Fort Vermilion School Division No. 52 or Fort Vermilion School Division is a public school authority within the Canadian province of Alberta operated out of Fort Vermilion.

See also 
List of school authorities in Alberta

References

External links 

http://fvsdaurora.com
 
School districts in Alberta